is a Japanese software entrepreneur.

Takasuka founded Cybozu, one of Japan's first Web-based groupware products. In 1997 with a $200,000 loan and two partners, Takasuka left his position as Vice President of Matsushita Electric Works V-Internet Operations in Osaka, Japan for the small city of Matsuyama, where he went to work developing Cybozu. Japanese for "cyber-kid", Cybozu held an initial public offering (IPO) within three  years. In April 2005 Takasuka resigned his position as President and CEO at Cybozu, and in January 2006 founded LUNARR, Inc. with his business partner, Hideshi Hamaguchi in Portland, Oregon, U.S.A. He currently lives in Portland, Oregon and Tokyo, Japan.

Personal history 
Born (1966, Matsuyama, Ehime, Japan)

Education 
1990, B.S. in Engineering Management, Hiroshima Institute of Technology

Professional 
Joins Matsushita Electric Works in 1990 in client-server networking and R&D. In 1994, develops Japan's first corporate Intranet with Hideshi Hamaguchi. In 1996, becomes Vice President/Director, V-Internet Operations Matsushita Electric Works, an in-house venture company he helped create.

External links 
  about.lunarr.com
 :ja:LUNARR Wikipedia.org Japanese
  The Oregonian Article

References 

1966 births
Living people
Japanese chief executives
People from Matsuyama, Ehime